The 2019 Japanese Super Cup (Fuji Xerox Super Cup 2019) was held on 16 February between the 2018 J1 League champions Kawasaki Frontale and the 2018 Emperor's Cup winner Urawa Red Diamonds. Kawasaki Frontale won the title in regular time.

Match details

See also
2018 J1 League
2018 Emperor's Cup

References

Japanese Super Cup
Super
Kawasaki Frontale matches
Urawa Red Diamonds matches